Nicky Larson et le parfum de Cupidon (also known as City Hunter) is a 2018 French action comedy film directed by Philippe Lacheau who also co-wrote the screenplay with Julien Arruti and Pierre Lacheau. It is an adaptation of the Japanese manga and anime series City Hunter (known as Nicky Larson in France) by Tsukasa Hojo, who agreed to the adaptation after reading the script. The film features Philippe Lacheau, Élodie Fontan, Tarek Boudali and Julien Arruti in lead roles, along with Didier Bourdon, Kamel Guenfoud, Sophie Mousel and Pamela Anderson in supporting roles. It was first released on 6 February 2019.

Synopsis 
Nicky Larson is an unusual private investigator, as talented a street fighter as he is a sniper. He is often called on to solve problems that no one can solve. Aided by his partner Laura, he offers multiple services to his customers, more or less dangerous. But, as professional and famous as he is, he has a major flaw: his particularly exacerbated penchant for the fairer sex, which poses a lot of worries to Laura.

One of his clients entrusts him one day the mission to protect the "Cupid's perfume", a fragrance that makes anyone who wears it absolutely irresistible. But a moment of distraction on Larson's part allow thugs to seize it. Nicky Larson must then recover the perfume.

Cast 
The characters are named as they are known in the French dubbed version of the anime series, while the Japanese dubbed version of the film uses their original names.

Promotion 
At the Comic Con Paris in October 2018, it was revealed that Jean-Paul Césari and Vincent Ropion would make cameos in the film. The first being the interpreter of the French credits song of the animated series while the second is the French voice of the main character.

Release 
The film was previewed over most of France on December 15, 2018, before its national release on February 6, 2019, the same in Switzerland. On February 13, 2019, the film was released in Belgium, on March 14, 2019 in Thailand and on May 23, 2019 in Russia under the title Undercover Playboy.

Box office 
The film debuted at #3 in France, with an opening weekend gross of €3,111,807 ($3,515,249). In France, the film sold more than 1million tickets and grossed €8,817,024 ($10,031,595) by 24 February 2019. As of 31 March 2019, the film has sold 1,684,350 tickets and grossed $12,898,742 in France.

The film released in Japan on 29 November 2019, debuting at #8 and grossing  from 38,676 admissions in its first three days. , the film has grossed  ($1,321,874) in Japan. In total, the film has sold 1,903,808 tickets and grossed $14,702,744 worldwide, .

Reception 
On December 14, 2018, the day before the premiere, Simon Riaux, in  his review for Écran large, wrote: ... "the film sends a handful of sometimes hilarious images, sometimes imbued with unexpected prettiness (...) in subjective vision in quilted pursuit", but "the story manages to hold an astonishing harmony between pastiche and first degree. (...) The dialogues appear more than once as the main weak point of the team". Frédéric Mignard from Avoir-alire admits that it is "probably the most sympathetic film of its author since the Babysittings, far from the recent shipwrecks in comic strip adaptation, like that of Gaston Lagaffe. (...) To tell the truth, the misunderstandings gags and the astonishing situations are typical of the work of Lacheau (...) and as one is never bored nor has the impression of wasting his time, one mays pardon him his few artistic wanderings."

On the other side, Alexandre Lazerges of GQ wrote that "Philippe Lacheau is worse than Qu'est-ce qu'on a encore fait au Bon Dieu?, destroying a cult manga despite the presence of Pamela Anderson and Dorothée"

See also
 City Hunter

References

External links 
 Official press kit of Nicky Larson et le Parfum du Cupidon
 Nicky Larson et le Parfum de Cupidon on Unifrance
 Nicky Larson et le Parfum de Cupidon on Allociné
 
 Philippe Lacheau and Tsukasa Hojo (北条 司) at Comic-Con Paris 2018

2010s French-language films
Live-action films based on manga
Films based on adaptations
Live-action films based on animated series
Films based on animated television series
French crime comedy films
2018 films
2010s crime comedy films
City Hunter
Films set in France
Slapstick films
2018 comedy films
Films directed by Philippe Lacheau
2010s French films